Edward Montague Hussey Cooper (August 12, 1906 – May 5, 2000) was an Australian born actor, later active in Britain and the United States. Known by his professional name of Edward Ashley (to avoid confusion with a fellow actor Edward Cooper), Cooper performed in 60 films for Metro Goldwyn Mayer including Pride and Prejudice (1940) where he played George Wickham.

Origins
Edward Montague Hussey Cooper was born on 12 August 1906  in Sydney, Australia, the  son of Edward Montague Hussey Cooper and Violet Coghill Maddrell. His father, Edward (known as Montague) was a Master Mariner and a Lieutenant in the Royal Naval Reserve, who worked as a second officer for the P&O Steam Navigation Company in Australia.

Despite his use of the surname Ashley-Cooper, there was no link to the Earl of Shaftesbury.

Career
Edward Ashley made a number of films in the United Kingdom before moving to California, United States, in 1940 where his first big role was George Wickham in Pride and Prejudice. After this his career consisted of a large number of mainly supporting roles until 1988, including a recurring character in the Maverick television series called "Nobby Ned Wingate" in the late 1950s.

Selected filmography

 The Beggar Student (1931) - Nicki
 Men of Steel (1932) - Sylvano
 The White Lilac (1935) - (uncredited)
 Under Proof (1936) - Ward Delaney
 Conquest of the Air (1936) - Minor Role (uncredited)
 Underneath the Arches (1937) - Carlos
 Sing as You Swing (1937) - Harrington
 Saturday Night Revue (1937) - Duke O'Brien
 The Villiers Diamond (1938) - Capt. Dawson
 Spies of the Air (1939) - Stuart
 Pride and Prejudice (1940) - Mr. Wickham
 Sky Murder (1940) - Cortland Grand
 Bitter Sweet (1940) - Harry Daventry
 Gallant Sons (1940) - Al Posna
 Maisie Was a Lady (1941) - Link Phillips
 Come Live with Me (1941) - Arnold Stafford
 You're Telling Me (1942) - Fred Curtis
 The Pied Piper (1942) - Charendon (uncredited)
 The Black Swan (1942) - Roger Ingram (uncredited)
 Love, Honor and Goodbye (1945) - William Baxter
 Gay Blades (1946) - Ted Brinker
 The Madonna's Secret (1946) - John Earl
 Nocturne (1946) - Keith Vincent
 The Other Love (1947) - Richard Shelton
 Dick Tracy Meets Gruesome (1947) - Dr. L. E. Thal
 Tarzan and the Mermaids (1948) - Commissioner
 Tarzan's Peril (1951) - Conners
 Macao (1952) - Martin Stewart
 Elephant Walk (1953) - Planter Gordon Gregory
 El Alamein (1953) - Capt. Harbison
 The Court Jester (1955) - Black Fox
 Darby's Rangers (1958) - Lt. Dave Manson
 King Rat (1965) - Prouty
 Herbie Rides Again (1974) - Announcer at Chicken Race
 Won Ton Ton, the Dog Who Saved Hollywood (1976) - Second Butler
 Beyond the Next Mountain (1987) - Governor
 Waxwork (1988) - Professor Sutherland (final film role)

Death
Edward Ashley died early 5 May 2000, aged 93, from congestive heart failure and was cremated with the remains scattered at sea, off the coast of San Diego County, California, on May 9, 2000. Ashley married actress Renee Torres in 1943 in Acapulco, Mexico. The couple returned to Acapulco in 1947 when Ashley was filming "Tarzan And The Mermaids."  Torres died in San Diego County, California, where the couple lived, preceding Edward in death in 1998. They lived in Oceanside, California.

References

External links

 
 

1906 births
2000 deaths
Australian expatriate male actors in the United States
Australian male film actors
Australian people of English descent
Male actors from Sydney
People from Oceanside, California
20th-century Australian male actors